The Vice Admiral, Gibraltar was an operational commander of the Royal Navy.  His subordinate units, establishments, and staff were sometimes informally known as the Flag Officer Gibraltar and North Atlantic they were charged with the administration of the RN Naval Base, Gibraltar and North Atlantic geographic area. The admiral commanding's post later became the Flag Officer Gibraltar.

History

At the outbreak of the Second World War the Gibraltar command was elevated to North Atlantic Command with responsibility for the sea lanes on either side of the Straits of Gibraltar. Those duties remained in place although the flag officers' mission was often unclear due to the operations of both Force H and the Western Approaches Command. It was these ambiguous boundaries of command responsibility between Gibraltar and Force H that led to confusion in the conduct of operations. In his book The Royal Navy and the Mediterranean, Brown discusses this problem and the Admiralty's response: The division of responsibility between the Flag Officer North Atlantic Command (FOCNA) and the Flag Officer Force H and the Commander in Chief Mediterranean was defined as follows:

F.O.C.N.A. was responsible for preventing the passage of Gibraltar Strait by all enemy vessels and by vessels of other nations as may be ordered by the Admiralty from time to time. While Force H was based on Gibraltar, F.O.C.N.A. was to call on, Flag Officer, Force H for such assistance as be necessary. Except when directed to carry out specific tasks by the Admiralty.

Commanders
Included:

Components
Base ship Gibraltar: HMS Cormorant

Before 1939, there was a small force of destroyers based at Gibraltar.

Capital Ships

Battleship:  (16/12/1939) 
Heavy Cruiser:  (31/12/1939)

Squadrons and Flotillas

 11th Cruiser Squadron 9 October 1939 
 13th Destroyer Flotilla September 1939–May 1945
 8th Submarine Flotilla December 1940–December 1942  (flotilla then moved to Algiers)

Sub-Divisions

 Destroyer Division 25, (assigned to 13th Destroyer Flotilla)
 Destroyer Division 26, (assigned to 13th Destroyer Flotilla)

Submarine and Minesweepers  Groups

 7th Anti Submarine Group
 92nd Minesweeping Group

Escort Groups were based at Gibraltar (although they were part of Western Approaches Command).

 Escort Group 28
 Escort Group 36
 Escort Group 37
 Escort Group 38

References

Sources
www.naval-history.net

External links
Naval History.net
British, Colonial, and Dominion Navies

No
Military units and formations established in 1939
Military units and formations disestablished in 1945
Military units and formations of the Royal Navy in World War II